Urbana Township may refer to the following townships in the United States:

 Urbana Township, Champaign County, Illinois
 Urbana Township, Champaign County, Ohio